Franklin Fairbanks (June 18, 1828 – April 24, 1895) was an American businessman, natural scientist, collector, political figure, and one of the founders and first trustees of Rollins College.

Biography
The son of Erastus Fairbanks and brother of Horace Fairbanks, Franklin Fairbanks was born in St. Johnsbury, Vermont on June 18, 1828.

At age 18, he entered Fairbanks Scales, the family business which manufactured platform scales. He became president of the company in 1888. Fairbanks was also an officer and director in a number of railroad, mining, manufacturing, banking, and telegraph businesses.

During the Civil War Fairbanks served on the staffs of Governors Hiland Hall and his father Erastus, with the rank of colonel, responsible for raising, equipping and training troops for the Union Army and dispatching them to the front lines.  In addition, he supervised Fairbanks Scales' production of matériel for the war effort, including artillery harness irons and other horse tack.

A Republican, he was a longtime member of Vermont's Republican State Committee. He was Town Meeting Moderator from 1871 to 1873 and 1879 to 1884.  He was also a member of the Vermont House of Representatives and served as Speaker from 1872 to 1874. In 1877 he received an honorary Master of Arts (M.A.) degree from Dartmouth College.

Fairbanks was a trustee of St. Johnsbury Academy. He donated the Fairbanks Museum and Planetarium to the town of St. Johnsbury., along with his collection of natural science specimens and related artifacts.

Fairbanks came to Winter Park, Florida, in 1881 with his friend and business associate, Charles Hosmer Morse, who was also from St. Johnsbury. Fairbanks was one of the founders of the city, and was one of the first investors to purchase lakefront property. Fairbanks was one of the first trustees of Rollins College and contributed towards its founding.

Death and burial

He died in St. Johnsbury on April 24, 1895.  He was buried at Mount Pleasant Cemetery in St. Johnsbury.

Legacy
His house in St. Johnsbury at 30 Western Avenue is on the list of the National Register of Historic Places.

The annual Franklin Fairbanks Award is presented to individuals who have made positive contributions to the operation and direction of the Fairbanks Museum.

Notes

1828 births
1895 deaths
St. Johnsbury Academy alumni
People from St. Johnsbury, Vermont
People from Winter Park, Florida
19th-century American businesspeople
American militia officers
People of Vermont in the American Civil War
Republican Party members of the Vermont House of Representatives
Speakers of the Vermont House of Representatives
Burials in Vermont
19th-century American politicians